Aleix Villatoro i Oliver (born 1979, in Terrassa), is a Catalan politician and professor. He is the secretary general of foreign affairs, institutional relations and transparency in Carles Puigdemont's government.

Villatoro has a degree in political science and public administration from the Autonomous University of Barcelona and postgraduate studies in analysis and political communication. He began his professional career in the Audiovisual Council of Catalonia (Consell de l'Audiovisual de Catalunya) where during the three-party coalition era between PSC, Esquerra, and ICV, he held several positions, including head of institutional relations at the Department of Culture and Media between 2006 and 2007 or chief of staff of the Ministry between 2007 and 2010. Currently he is assistant to the Director of the Fundació Joan Miró and professor of audiovisual communication of the International University of Catalonia (Universitat Internacional de Catalunya).

References 

Politicians from Catalonia
Autonomous University of Barcelona alumni
1979 births
Living people
People from Terrassa